B. indica may refer to:
 Bandicota indica, the greater bandicoot rat, a species of rodent in the family Muridae
Beijerinckia indica, a species of aerobic bacteria
Bhesa indica, a species of flowering tree
Bruxanelia indica, a member of the coffee family
Buddleja indica, a species of evergreen shrub

Synonyms
 Balanites indica, a synonym for Balanites roxburghii, a spiny, evergreen tree
 Bignonia indica, a synonym for Oroxylum indicum, the Indian trumpet flower tree
 Bitrimonospora indica, a synonym for Monosporascus eutypoides

See also
 Indica (disambiguation)